The Men's 50 metre freestyle competition at the 2022 World Aquatics Championships was held on 23 and 24 June 2022.

Records
Prior to the competition, the existing world and championship records were as follows.

Results

Heats
The heats were held on 23 June at 09:30.

Semifinals
The semifinals started on 23 June at 18:42.

Swim-off
The swim-off started on 23 June at 20:13.

Final
The final was held on 24 June at 18:09.

References

Men's 50 metre freestyle